The Country Schoolmaster may refer to:

 The Country Schoolmaster (1933 film), a 1933 German drama film
 The Country Schoolmaster (1954 film), a 1954 West German drama film